Oued Saoura is an intermittent river, or wadi, formed from the confluence of the Oued Guir and Oued Zouzfana at Igli, forming the Saoura valley. While in the past the flow of the river was steady and plentiful, in recent years it has diminished due to the construction of the Djorf Torba dam on the Oued Guir.

Course
From Igli the Oued Saoura runs through Béchar Province past the towns of Béni Abbès, Tamtert, El Ouata, Béni Ikhlef, Kerzaz, Timoudi, Ouled Khoudir, and Ksabi, then passes under the N6 highway before reaching the endorheic lake Sebkha el Melah.

References

Saoura
Geography of Béchar Province